Gilbert Creek is a stream in the U.S. state of West Virginia.

Gilbert Creek was named after Joseph Gilbert, an early settler.

See also
List of rivers of West Virginia

References

Rivers of Mingo County, West Virginia
Rivers of West Virginia